Jiayin County is a county in Heilongjiang Province, China, bordering Russian oblasts of Amur and Jewish.  It is under the administration of the prefecture-level city of Yichun and the county seat is Chaoyang Town situated on the southern (right) bank of the Amur River.

Administrative divisions 
Jiayin County is divided into 4 towns and 5 townships. 
4 towns
 Chaoyang, Wuyun, Wulaga, Baoxing
5 townships
 Changsheng, Xiangyang, Hujia, Hongguang, Qingshan

Demographics 

Climate

Notes and references

External links
  Government site - 

 
Jiayin
Yichun, Heilongjiang